Richard Samuel "Rick" Recht (born August 28, 1970) is an American rock musician who was one of the early pioneers of contemporary Jewish rock music in the early 2000s, performing for Jewish teenage and young adult audiences.

Career
Recht grew up in St. Louis, Missouri. By the late 1990s, he was a member of a band and worked as a song leader at a Jewish day camp in St. Louis.

By the early 2000s, Recht and his band were touring nationwide, delivering about 150 performances a year, included for an estimated audience of 30,000 people at the Los Angeles Jewish Festival in 2003.

In 2010, Recht founded Jewish Rock Radio, one of the first exclusively Jewish rock online radio stations in the United States.

Recht is the Artist-in-Residence at the United Hebrew Congregation in Chesterfield, Missouri, where he provides music for Shabbat, High Holidays, and other programming.

Works
Recht has released 10 studio albums of Jewish music, including 2solo children's albums.

References

External links
 Rick Recht official site

1970 births
American rock musicians
Living people
Jewish American musicians
Jewish rock musicians
Jewish folk singers
People from St. Louis County, Missouri
21st-century American Jews